The 2012–13 Slovak Cup, also known as Slovnaft Cup for sponsorship reasons, was the 44th edition of the competition. 43 clubs participated in the tournament. The winners of the competition, ŠK Slovan Bratislava, as a 2013–14 Slovak First Football League champions qualified for the second qualifying round of the 2013–14 UEFA Champions League. The Slovak Cup runner-up team, MŠK Žilina, qualified for the first qualifying round of the 2013–14 UEFA Europa League.

Participating teams
Corgoň Liga (12 teams)
(all teams received a bye to the 2nd round)

 AS Trenčín
 Spartak Myjava
 Dukla Banská Bystrica
 MFK Košice

 FC Nitra
 MFK Ružomberok
 FK Senica
 Slovan Bratislava

 Spartak Trnava
 1. FC Tatran Prešov
 ViOn Zlaté Moravce
 MŠK Žilina

2. liga (11 teams)

 MFK Dubnica
 Partizán Bardejov
 Baník Ružiná (bye to the 2nd round)
 Tatran Liptovský Mikuláš

 SFM Senec (bye to the 2nd round)
 ŠTK Šamorín
 Zemplín Michalovce
 MŠK Rimavská Sobota

 DAC Dunajská Streda (bye to the 2nd round)
 Šport Podbrezová
 Slovan Duslo Šaľa

Keno 10 3. liga (17 teams)

 Slovan Nemšová
 FK Pohronie
 FKM Nové Zámky
 OFK Dunajská Lužná
 OTJ Moravany
 PFK Piešťany

 LAFC Lučenec
 ŠKF Sereď
 FC Petržalka 1898
 FK Moldava
 FK Poprad
 Fomat Martin

 AFC Nové Mesto (bye to the 2nd round)
 LP Domino (bye to the 2nd round)
 MŠK Námestovo (bye to the 2nd round)
 Odeva Lipany (bye to the 2nd round)
 Lokomotíva Košice (bye to the 2nd round)

Majstrovstvá Regiónu (3 teams)

 FK Haniska
 Raven Považská Bystrica
 Baník Kalinovo (bye to the 2nd round)

Matches

First round

Second round

Third round

Quarter-finals

Semi-finals

Slovan Bratislava won 6−1 on aggregate.

MŠK Žilina won 4−3 on aggregate.

Final

References

Slovak Cup seasons
Cup
Slovak Cup